Dawn Alice Lake (20 January 1927 – 1 January 2006) was an Australian television comedian, singer, entertainer, and actor whose career spanned more than 50 years. She was particularly associated in show business with her husband Bobby Limb. 
 
Entertainer Bert Newton described her as "our greatest comedienne – Australia's Lucille Ball". She was particularly associated in show business with her husband Bobby Limb.

Life

Dawn Lake was born to a Balmain working-class family, the youngest of four children. She married entertainer Bobby Limb in 1953 and they had one daughter, Debbie, born in 1955.

She was married to Limb for 46 years, though the marriage had its ups and downs, including a separation for a year in 1973. She lost her brother, David, to suicide in 1965. Bobby Limb died in 1999, after which she withdrew from performing life.

Career

She started her career as a singer in a local dance hall when she was 21, and soon after was contracted to Joe Taylor's Celebrity Club circuit. She met Bobby Limb at this time. After their marriage in 1953, they went to the UK where she had won a contract to sing with the BBC Show Band.  Their careers went well in England over the next four years, with Lake appearing frequently as a guest on the Cyril Stapleton radio show, and with the couple appearing at the London Palladium and on the Moss Empire circuit. On their return to Australia in 1957 she appeared on the Tivoli circuit, and sang on 2UE and ABC radio stations, frequently with Bobby Limb's band.

While she came to prominence on radio programs compered by Jack Davey and comedian George Wallace, she found her greatest fame through her collaborations with Bobby Limb on the early Australian television programs The Mobil Limb Show produced by TCN9, Bobby Limb's Sound of Music, and, for two years in the mid-1960s, Here's Dawn. Limb's production company also created the situation comedy series The Private World of Miss Prim (1966) as a vehicle for Lake, but the series was short-lived. Lake was subsequently a regular for the 1967 season of the top-rated sketch comedy program The Mavis Bramston Show.

Through the 1970s she guest starred in Australian drama series such as Division 4 and Glenview High, and appeared as a panellist on Graham Kennedy's game show Blankety Blanks. She also made a few appearances in dramatic feature films of this period, with roles in Squeeze a Flower, Sunstruck, Alvin Purple, and the controversial Wake in Fright. She also returned to the stage at this time, appearing such shows as Some of My Best Friends Aren't, Just for Arthur, Move Over Mrs Markham and The Mating Season (opposite Sid James). In her later life she participated in a series of national concerts for seniors, organised by Limb.

Bobby Limb and Dawn Lake entertained Australian troops in Vietnam, and were active in the campaign to elect the Whitlam Labor government in 1972, including taking part in the campaign song, It's Time.

Her most enduring character was Ethel, who first appeared in the early 1960s in The Mobil Limb Show. "You tell 'em, luv!" was Ethel's catchcry, a line which was quickly adopted by Federal politicians during parliamentary Question Time.

Filmography

FILM

TELEVISION

Selected appearances
{|class="wikitable"
| Title
| Year
|-
| Show Case (TV series) || 1954
|-
| It's A Great Life   (TV series) || 1955
|-
| Bandwagon (TV special) || 1958 as Singer
|-
| Buster Fiddess Memorial Concert (TV special) || 1972 
|-
| The Mobil Limb Show || Selected appearances 
|-
| Bobby Limb's Sound of Music || Selected appearances
|-
| Celebrity Squares (game show) || 1975 
|-
| Blankety Blanks (TV series) ||| 1977
|-
| This is Your Life (TV series) || 1978 
|-
| Celebrity Tattle Tales (TV series) ||1980 
|}

Awards

Notes

References
Anderson, Doug (2006) "One out of the box, radio, stage: Dawn Lake, Entertainer, 1927-2006" in The Sydney Morning Herald'', Weekend Edition, 21–22 January 2006, p. 38

External links

1927 births
2006 deaths
Australian film actresses
Australian radio actresses
Australian television actresses
Australian women comedians
Comedians from Sydney
Logie Award winners
20th-century Australian comedians
20th-century Australian women